Hartford is a village in Madison County, Illinois, United States, on the Mississippi River near the mouth of the Missouri River. The population was 1,185 at the 2020 census, down from 1,429 in 2010. Lewis and Clark spent the winter of 1803-04 there, near what has been designated the Lewis and Clark State Historic Site.

Geography
Hartford is located in western Madison County at  (38.824498, -90.092509). Lewis and Clark State Historic Site is within the village limits, directly across from the Missouri River confluence.

Hartford is bordered to the north by the city of Wood River, to the east by the village of South Roxana, and to the south by Granite City. Illinois Route 3 passes through the west side of the village, leading northwest  to Alton and south  to East St. Louis. Illinois Route 111 runs along the eastern border of Hartford, leading north  to the center of Wood River and south  to Fairmont City.

The Cahokia Creek Diversion Channel passes through the southern part of the village limits, reaching the Mississippi River at the Lewis and Clark Historic Site.

Demographics

As of the census of 2000, there were 1,545 people, 650 households, and 434 families residing in the village. The racial makeup of the village was 98.45% White, 0.13% African American, 0.19% Native American, 0.32% Asian, 0.06% Pacific Islander, 0.32% from other races, and 0.52% from two or more races. Hispanic or Latino of any race were 0.71% of the population.

There were 650 households, of which 27.8% had children under the age of 18 living with them, 52.9% were married couples living together, 11.1% had a female householder with no husband present, and 33.1% were non-families. 28.5% of all households were made up of individuals, and 13.8% had someone living alone who was 65 years of age or older. The average household size was 2.38 and the average family size was 2.89.

In the village, the population was spread out, with 23.3% under the age of 18, 7.5% from 18 to 24, 28.9% from 25 to 44, 23.6% from 45 to 64, and 16.8% who were 65 years of age or older. The median age was 39 years. For every 100 females, there were 101.4 males. For every 100 females age 18 and over, there were 94.6 males.

The median income for a household in the village was $33,828, and the median income for a family was $40,652. Males had a median income of $31,694 versus $20,156 for females. The per capita income for the village was $16,160. About 10.3% of families and 13.0% of the population were below the poverty line, including 20.8% of those under age 18 and 4.6% of those age 65 or over.

Underground gas plume 
Numerous oil refineries have occupied the area for many years. An estimated 4 million gallons of gasoline have seeped into the ground under Hartford.  The village filed suit on July 21, 2008, against multiple parties over the underground gas plume.

Chemetco, Inc 
The copper smelter Chemetco operated nearby for around 30 years, ending in 2001. The corporation was found guilty of Clean Water Act offenses after its sustained pollution of Long Lake, a tributary of the Mississippi River, over a ten-year period. This ended following the detection by EPA inspectors of a secret hazardous waste pipe in September 1996. The location, just south of Hartford near the community of Mitchell, was listed as a Superfund priority cleanup site March 4, 2010.

Notable people
Hartford is the birthplace of actor Clint Walker, known for the television series Cheyenne and for the movies The Ten Commandments and The Dirty Dozen.

See also
Hartford Castle

References

External links
 
 "Chemetco: One polluter, three perspectives" - Original case study of the sustained criminal pollution of Long Lake by Chemetco

Villages in Madison County, Illinois
Villages in Illinois
Illinois populated places on the Mississippi River